Stenoma externella is a moth of the family Depressariidae. It is found in Brazil (Amazonas) and Guyana.

The wingspan is about 17 mm. The forewings are pale yellow ochreous with a dark fuscous dorsal blotch extending from the base to the middle and reaching three-fourths across the wing, posteriorly obliquely rounded. There is a fascia-like patch of fuscous suffusion from beyond the cell to the dorsum before the tornus and a narrow terminal interrupted fascia of fuscous suffusion, leaving a terminal edge of ground colour. The hindwings are grey.

References

Moths described in 1864
Stenoma